Patrick Mooney (12 November 1903 – 30 October 1989) was an Irish Fianna Fáil politician. He was elected to Dáil Éireann as a Fianna Fáil Teachta Dála (TD) for the Monaghan constituency at the 1954 general election. He was re-elected at the 1957, 1961 and 1965 general elections but lost his seat at the 1969 general election.

References

1903 births
1989 deaths
Fianna Fáil TDs
Members of the 15th Dáil
Members of the 16th Dáil
Members of the 17th Dáil
Members of the 18th Dáil
Politicians from County Monaghan